Lake Mácha is a pond in the municipal territory of Doksy in the Liberec Region of the Czech Republic. With an area of  it is the largest pond in the region and therefore is called a lake, despite its artificial origin.

History
During the Cenozoic Era, a large lake existed at this site (as a remnant of an older sea). During the last ice age, the lake drained away, leaving only a peat bog.

In 1367 Charles IV ordered a large pond to be established here.

Its older name was Velký rybník ('Big Pond', or in German Großteich) or Hirschberský rybník ('Big Hirschberg Pond', or in German Hirschberger Großteich). Its current name was established after 1945 and officially since 1961. The name refers to the romantic poet Karel Hynek Mácha.

References

External links
 

Macha
Geography of the Liberec Region
Česká Lípa District
Macha